The qualifying competition for the 2020 CONCACAF Men's Olympic Qualifying Championship determined five of the eight teams of the final tournament. Players born on or after 1 January 1997 were eligible to compete in the tournament.

Teams
A total of 25 CONCACAF teams (out of 41) entered Olympic qualifying, with 22 involved in regional qualifiers for the final tournament. The entrants were divided into three zones:
North American Zone (NAFU): All three teams (Canada, Mexico, and the United States) qualified automatically for the final tournament.
Central American Zone (UNCAF): Six out of seven teams entered, with three teams qualifying for the final tournament.
Caribbean Zone (CFU): Sixteen out of 31 teams entered, with two teams qualifying for the final tournament.

Notes
Teams in bold qualified for the final tournament.
(N): Not a member of the International Olympic Committee, ineligible for Olympics
(Q): Qualified automatically for final tournament
(W): Withdrew after draw

Draw
The draw for the Caribbean preliminary round took place on 17 April 2019, 11:00 EDT (UTC−4), at the CONCACAF Headquarters in Miami. The sixteen teams which entered the Caribbean preliminary round were drawn into four groups of four teams. Based on the FIFA World Rankings (as of 4 April 2019), the sixteen teams were distributed into four pots, with teams in Pot 1 assigned to each group prior to the draw, as follows:

The matchups of the Caribbean play-in round, played between the four Caribbean preliminary round group winners, were determined as follows:
Winner Group A v Winner Group D
Winner Group B v Winner Group C

Each tie was played as a single match, with the higher-ranked team according to the seeding used for the preliminary round draw hosting the match.

No draw was made for the Central American matchups, which were based on the FIFA World Rankings (as of 4 April 2019), as follows:

Each tie was played as two-legged home-and-away matches, with the higher-ranked team according to the seeding hosting the second leg.

Central America
The first legs were played on 17 July, and the second legs were played on 21 July 2019. Winners qualified for the 2020 CONCACAF Men's Olympic Qualifying Championship.

|}

Costa Rica won 3–2 on aggregate.

Honduras won 5–0 on aggregate.

El Salvador won 3–1 on aggregate.

Caribbean
The Group A, B, and D matches were played between 17–21 July, and the Group C matches were played between 24–28 July 2019. Group winners qualified for the play-in round.

Preliminary round

Group A
Matches were played at the Anthony Spaulding Sports Complex, Kingston in Jamaica. All times are local, EST (UTC−5).

Group B
Matches were played at the Bethlehem Soccer Complex, Saint Croix in United States Virgin Islands. All times are local, AST (UTC−4).

Group C
Matches were played at the Truman Bodden Sports Complex, George Town in Cayman Islands. All times are local, EST (UTC−5).

Group D
Matches were played at the Estadio Panamericano, San Cristóbal in Dominican Republic. All times are local, AST (UTC−4).

Play-in round
The higher ranked teams according to the seeding, Saint Kitts and Nevis and Haiti, each hosted a one-legged elimination match. The winners qualified for the 2020 CONCACAF Men's Olympic Qualifying Championship.

Qualified teams
The following eight teams qualified for the final tournament.

1 Bold indicates champions for that year. Italic indicates hosts for that year.

References

External links
Concacaf Men's Olympic Qualifying, CONCACAF.com

Qualification
Olympic Qualifying Championship, Men's qualification
2019 in youth association football
July 2019 sports events in North America
September 2019 sports events in North America